Daniel Omoya Braaten (born 25 May 1982) is a Norwegian former professional footballer who played as a winger. He has previously played for Skeid, Rosenborg, Bolton Wanderers, Toulouse, Brann and Stabæk. He has been capped 52 times for the Norway national team, scoring 4 goals.

Club career

Early career

Braaten was born in Oslo, Norway. He started his career in the Skeid youth academy at the age of six. He later won the Norwegian Junior Cup with the team in 1999, aged 17. The following year he was promoted to the first team, where he played for four years before joining giants Rosenborg BK in 2004, after 102 caps and 22 goals for Skeid. Before signing for Rosenborg, Braaten had attracted interest from various clubs in Norway and abroad, and had a trial with French side RC Lens in late 2003 with Daniel Fredheim Holm. Braaten had however trained with Rosenborg as early as autumn 2002, but was still in contract with Skeid, before signing in 2004 for approximately £250,000.

Braaten had become one of the most profiled players of the Norwegian Premier League, through his colourful, untraditional and artistic playing style. He had become known especially for his individual technical skills and physical strength, and as a player who did unexpected things on the field, surprising both opposing players and the audience. He was famous not only for his pace, but also for his mastery of the seal dribble, an incredibly difficult trick involving running while bouncing (and controlling) the ball on top of the head.

European career

On 3 August 2007, Braaten signed for Bolton Wanderers for a reported fee of £450,000. He scored his first goal in English football just over three weeks later, netting the final goal in Bolton's 3–0 win over Reading. He failed to secure a permanent spot on the team, however, and after a tough season in England, Braaten signed a three-year contract with French side Toulouse on 25 June 2008. He was included as part of the deal which saw Johan Elmander move to Bolton. He scored his first league goal in Toulouse's 4–1 victory over Paris Saint-Germain. He performed a unique celebration by spinning on his back while spinning upwards at the same time after scoring his first goal for the club. He was released from his contract in July 2013.

Two months later, in September, Braaten signed a one-year-long deal with Danish side Copenhagen, where he was given shirt no. 22. During his time in the Danish capital, he scored one goal in the league and a back-heel goal in the UEFA Champions League to secure a 1–0 victory over Galatasaray. At the end of the season Braaten left Copenhagen without a new contract and returned to Norway.

Return to Norway
On 9 February 2015, Braaten signed a one-year deal with Kjetil Rekdal and Vålerenga in the Norwegian Tippeliga after almost eight months as a free agent. He scored his first, and only, goal for his new club away versus Sandefjord on his birthday, 25 May. On 3 December 2015, it was announced that his contract would not be renewed, something that surprised many critics as he had performed well in the previous season. After training with SK Brann during the winter, he signed a one-year contract with the club on 21 February 2016, his fourth club in just as many years. After 55 games for Brann, he left the club at the end of the 2018 season.

International career

After playing four matches for Norway U18 in 2000, and two matches for Norway U21 in 2003, Braaten made his debut for Norway on 22 January 2004 in a friendly match against Sweden, when playing for Skeid in Adeccoligaen, the second-tier league in Norway. His first international goal came against Estonia, in a Friendly match on 20 April 2005, a game Norway won 2–1. As of May 2018, he has been capped 52 times for Norway, scoring four goals.

Career statistics

Club

International

Scores and results list Norway's goal tally first, score column indicates score after each Braaten goal

Honours
Rosenborg
Tippeligaen: 2004, 2006

References

External links

 
 
 Player profile on RBK official site
 

1982 births
Living people
Footballers from Oslo
Norwegian footballers
Association football wingers
Skeid Fotball players
Rosenborg BK players
Bolton Wanderers F.C. players
Toulouse FC players
F.C. Copenhagen players
Vålerenga Fotball players
Eliteserien players
Norwegian First Division players
Premier League players
Ligue 1 players
Danish Superliga players
Norway youth international footballers
Norway under-21 international footballers
Norway international footballers
Norwegian expatriate footballers
Expatriate men's footballers in Denmark
Expatriate footballers in England
Expatriate footballers in France
Norwegian expatriate sportspeople in Denmark
Norwegian expatriate sportspeople in England
Norwegian expatriate sportspeople in France
Norwegian people of Nigerian descent